The following highways are numbered 169:

Canada
 Prince Edward Island Route 169
  Quebec Route 169

Costa Rica
 National Route 169

India
 National Highway 169 (India)

Ireland
 R169 road

Japan
 Japan National Route 169

United States
 U.S. Route 169
 Alabama State Route 169
 Arizona State Route 169
 Arkansas Highway 169
 California State Route 169
 Connecticut State Route 169
 Florida State Road 169 (former)
 Georgia State Route 169
 Illinois Route 169
 Kentucky Route 169
 Louisiana Highway 169
 Maine State Route 169
 Maryland Route 169
 Massachusetts Route 169
 M-169 (Michigan highway) (former)
 U.S. Route 169 in Minnesota
 Nevada State Route 169
 New Jersey Route 169 (former)
 New Mexico State Road 169
 New York State Route 169
 Ohio State Route 169
 Tennessee State Route 169
 Texas State Highway 169
 Texas State Highway Spur 169
 Utah State Route 169 (former)
 Virginia State Route 169
 Washington State Route 169
 Wisconsin Highway 169
Territories
 Puerto Rico Highway 169